A Place in Heaven is a 2013 Israeli drama film written and directed by Yossi Madmoni. It was screened in the Contemporary World Cinema section at the 2013 Toronto International Film Festival.

Cast
 Alon Moni Aboutboul as Bambi
 Tom Graziani  as Nimrod
  as Ayala
   as Rabbi Simcha
 Sophia Ostritsky as Yulia, Bambi's companion
  as Hila, Nimrod's wife
 Michael Aloni as Young Nimrod
  as the Butcher
  as Ayala's father

Accolades
 Best Actor (Alon Abutbul)
 Best Actress (Rotem Zisman Cohen)
 Best Supporting Actress (Keren Berger)
 Best Cinematography (Boaz Yehonatan Yaacov)
 Best Screenplay (Joseph Madmony)
 Best Production Design (Miguel Markin)
 Best Costume Design (Laura Sheim)
 Best Makeup (Ronit Dugo Arviv)
 Best Original Music (Ophir Leibovitch)
 Best Original Soundtrack (Tuli Hen, Alex Claude, Daniel Meir)

References

External links
 
 A Place in Heaven at CinemaOfIsrael.com

2013 films
2013 drama films
Israeli drama films
2010s Hebrew-language films